Prince Dōjonyūdō (道助入道親王, Dōjonyūdō shinnō, 1196-1249) was a waka poet and Japanese nobleman active in the early Kamakura period. He was a son of Emperor Go-Toba.

External links 
E-text of his poems  

1196 births
1249 deaths
13th-century Japanese poets
Shingon Buddhist monks
Kamakura period Buddhist clergy
Japanese Buddhist monarchs